Morton Township is one of nine townships in Boyd County, Nebraska, United States. The population was 137 at the 2000 census. A 2006 estimate placed the township's population at 123.

The Village of Gross lies within the Township.

See also
County government in Nebraska

References

External links
City-Data.com

Townships in Boyd County, Nebraska
Townships in Nebraska